You Got It All – The Album is the second studio album by British boy band Union J. It was released in the United Kingdom on 8 December 2014 through Syco Music, Sony Music, Epic Records.

"Tonight (We Live Forever)" was released as the album's first single in August 2014 and reached number nine in the United Kingdom, making it the group's third top 10 hit. The title track "You Got It All" was released on 30 November. This was the last album to feature the original members after George Shelley and Josh Cuthbert left the group.

Singles
"Tonight (We Live Forever)" was released as the album's first single in August 2014 and reached number nine in the United Kingdom, marking the group's third top 10 hit.

In October 2014, the band confirmed their second single would be "You Got It All". It was released on 30 November 2014 in the UK and peaked at number 2, becoming the band's highest-charting single to date.

Chart performance

You Got It All – The Album debuted at number 28 on the UK Albums Chart, selling 15,000 copies on its first week. The following week, the album dropped 23 places to number 51.

Track listing

Charts

References

2014 albums
Epic Records albums
Union J albums
Albums produced by Jon Maguire